Hendrik "Henk" Hordijk (19 September 1893 – 4 December 1975) was a Netherlands association football player, who played as a midfielder for AFC Ajax and for the Netherlands national team.

Career
Hordijk played 194 matches for Ajax from 1917 to 1927. He was a member of the first team that won the national championship in the 1917/1918 season. He was then selected to play for the Netherlands national football team, appearing in 9 matches for Oranje without scoring. In his last season with Ajax, 1926/27 he became the top scorer of the club with 19 goals in 21 match appearances.

References

External links
 Henk Hordijk at OnsOranje
 Henk Hordijk statistics at Voetbalstats.nl

1893 births
1975 deaths
Footballers from Utrecht (city)
Association football midfielders
Dutch footballers
Netherlands international footballers
AFC Ajax players